Jurabuprestis karatauensis is a fossil species of beetles in the family Buprestidae, the only species in the genus Jurabuprestis.

References

Prehistoric beetle genera
Monotypic Buprestidae genera